Robert Albert Simpson (1888 – after 1913) was an English professional footballer, born in Chorlton-cum-Hardy, Lancashire, who played as a forward in the Scottish League for Aberdeen, in the Football League for Bradford Park Avenue, and in the Southern League for Brighton & Hove Albion.

His brother, J.J. Simpson, also played league football for Aberdeen.

References

1888 births
Year of death missing
People from Chorlton-cum-Hardy
English footballers
Association football forwards
Aberdeen F.C. players
Bradford (Park Avenue) A.F.C. players
Brighton & Hove Albion F.C. players
Scottish Football League players
English Football League players
Southern Football League players